The network probability matrix describes the probability structure of a network based on the historical presence or absence of edges in a network.  For example, individuals in a social network are not connected to other individuals with uniform random probability.  The probability structure is much more complex.  Intuitively, there are some people whom a person will communicate with or be connected more closely than others.  For this reason, real-world networks tend to have clusters or cliques of nodes that are more closely related than others (Albert and Barabasi, 2002, Carley [year], Newmann 2003).  This can be simulated by varying the probabilities that certain nodes will communicate. The network probability matrix was originally proposed by Ian McCulloh.

References 
 McCulloh, I., Lospinoso, J. & Carley, K.M. (2007). Probability Mechanics in Communications Networks. In Proceedings of the 12th International Conference on Applied Mathematics of the World Science Engineering Academy and Society, Cairo, Egypt. 30–31 December 2007.
 "Understanding Network Science," (Archived article) https://wayback-beta.archive.org/web/20080830045705/http://zangani.com/blog/2007-1030-networkingscience
 Linked: The New Science of Networks, A.-L. Barabási (Perseus Publishing, Cambridge (2002).
 Network Science, The National Academies Press (2005)

External links 
 Center for Computational Analysis of Social and Organizational Systems (CASOS) at Carnegie Mellon University
 U.S. Military Academy Network Science Center
 The Center for Interdisciplinary Research on Complex Systems at Northeastern University

Social statistics